Rigoberto is a 1945 Argentine comedy film directed by Luis Mottura.

A man finances the invention of a friend overshadowed and dominated by the women of his family.

Cast

External links
 

1945 films
1940s Spanish-language films
Argentine black-and-white films
1945 comedy films
Argentine comedy films
1940s Argentine films